K. Shivashankar (7 December 1948 – 28 November 2021) was an Indian dance choreographer who worked in more than 10 languages but majorly with South Indian films, including Tamil films & Telugu films.

Early life
Shivashankar was born in Govindappa Naicken Street, Parrys, Chennai, on 7 December 1948, to Kalyana Sundaram and Komala Amal. His father was wholesale fruit vendor in Kothawal Chavadi. His backbone was fractured at a very young age in an accident for which and recovered around 8 years of age under the extensive care of his aunts. He was initially home schooled and later studied in Hindu Theological Higher Secondary School, Sowcarpet. He attributed his feminine mannerism to his growing up without much contact with the outside world and where women in family were taking care of him mostly. His father was highly skilled with immense knowledge in Carnatic music & Astrology, but very strict with his children. While his father attended carnatic music festival, Sivasankar was asked to go for drama & dance festivals to represent him. This inspired him to learn dance. He learnt basics in dance from Natraj & Sakunthala, Mylapore. Later, he joined as assistant to dance master Saleem in 1974.

Career
Having worked on over 800 feature films, Sivasankar has won the Tamil Nadu State Film Award for Best Choreographer for Poove Unakkaga (1996), Vishwa Thulasi (2003), Varalaru (2006) and Uliyin Osai (2008). Sivasankar won the National Film Award for Best Choreography for his work in S. S. Rajamouli's historical drama Magadheera (2008), with the jury noting he was rewarded "for breath taking energy and innovation" in the song "Dheera Dheera Dheera". His experience at the official ceremony was reported in the media after he was critical of the delay in allowing him into the venue. In 2003, his super-fast choreography of super hit song Manmadha Raasa for Thiruda Thirudi film was widely talked about. In 2003, he was awarded an honorary doctorate from New International Christian University, Bangalore for his services to dance.

Sivasankar has also appeared in acting roles, notably starring as Ajith Kumar's dance instructor in K. S. Ravikumar's Varalaru (2006). The choreographer was asked to design the dance sequences but also the action sequences and the overall body language of Ajith, to depict him in a feminine way. He later portrayed the role of a Christian missionary in Bala's period drama Paradesi (2013), who works to convert the religion of naive tea workers.

Death
Sivasankar died from COVID-19 at a private hospital in Hyderabad on 28 November 2021, at the age of 72.

Notable filmography

As choreographer

Paattum Bharathamum (1975) - debut as Assistant 
Kavikkuyil (1977) 
Kuruvikoodu (1980) -  debut as Dance Master
Saattai Illatha Pambaram (1983)
Mann Vasanai (1983)
Khaidi (1983)
Manaivi Oru Manickam (1990)
Chakravyuham (1992)
Marupadiyum (1993)
En Aasai Machan (1994)
Ammoru (1995)
Poove Unakkaga (1996)
Suryavamsam (1997)
Suyamvaram (1999)
Vetri Kodi Kattu (2000)
Thiruda Thirudi (2003)
Vishwa Thulasi (2004)
Allari Pidugu (2005)
Varalaru (2006)
Uliyin Osai (2008)
Magadheera (2009)
Arundhati (2009)
Mahatma (2009)
Baahubali: The Beginning (2015)

As actor

Television

Awards and honours

National Film Awards 
 2009: "Dheera Dheera Dheera" in Magadheera (for Best Choreography)

Tamil Nadu State Film Award for Best Choreographer
 1996: Poove Unakkaga
 2004: Vishwa Thulasi
 2006: Varalaaru
 2008: Uliyin Osai

References

External links
 

1948 births
2021 deaths
Bharatanatyam exponents
Tamil male actors
Indian choreographers
Indian film choreographers
Male actors in Tamil cinema
Performers of Indian classical dance
20th-century Indian dancers
Kathakali exponents
Best Choreography National Film Award winners
Male actors in Telugu television
Male actors from Chennai
Deaths from the COVID-19 pandemic in India